Acton-Agua Dulce Unified School District is a school district serving the rural unincorporated communities of Acton and Agua Dulce in northern Los Angeles County, California.

The district includes three schools, all in Acton: Vasquez High School, High Desert Middle School, and Meadowlark Elementary School.

References

School districts in Los Angeles County, California